Czyżyny is one of 18 districts of Kraków, located in the central part of the city. The name Czyżyny comes from a village of same name that is now a part of the district. 

Subdivisions of Czyżyny
Czyżyny is divided into smaller subdivisions (osiedles). Here's a list of them.
 Łęg
 Osiedle 2 Pułku Lotniczego
 Osiedle Akademickie
 Osiedle Dywizjonu 303
 Osiedle Czyżyny

Population

References

External links
 Official website of Czyżyny
 Biuletyn Informacji Publicznej 

Districts of Kraków